The men's 100 metre backstroke event at the 2016 Summer Olympics took place between 7–8 August at the Olympic Aquatics Stadium.

Summary
Ryan Murphy continued the streak of American dominance in the sprint backstroke, as he pulled away from the rest of the field to claim his country's sixth straight Olympic title. He fired off a 51.97 to eclipse Matt Grevers' 2012 Olympic record by 0.19 of a second for gold, making him the only second swimmer in the event's history besides Aaron Peirsol to break the 52-second barrier and the fastest of all-time in textile. Meanwhile, China's Xu Jiayu put up a brisk effort to take silver with a 52.31, and spoil the 1–2 finish for the Americans. Murphy's fellowman David Plummer, aged 30, finished with bronze in 52.40 at his maiden Games.

Leading the race early on the initial length, Australia's defending world champion Mitch Larkin missed the podium with a fourth-place time in 52.43. France's Camille Lacourt picked up the fifth spot in 52.70, with Russian swimmer and Youth Olympic champion Evgeny Rylov (52.74) trailing him by a 0.04-second margin. Japan's Ryosuke Irie (53.42), the Olympic bronze medalist from London 2012, and Romania's Robert Glință (53.50) rounded out the field.

The medals for the competition were presented by Albert II, Prince of Monaco, IOC member, and the gifts were presented by Mustapha Larfaoui, FINA honorary life president.

Records
Prior to this competition, the existing world and Olympic records were as follows.

The following records were established during the competition:

Murphy then set a new world record for the 100 m backstroke with a time of 51.85 seconds on August 13 in the lead-off leg as part of the 4 × 100 m medley relay.

Competition format

The competition consisted of three rounds: heats, semifinals, and a final. The swimmers with the best 16 times in the heats advanced to the semifinals. The swimmers with the best 8 times in the semifinals advanced to the final. Swim-offs were used as necessary to break ties for advancement to the next round.

Results

Heats

Semifinals

Semifinal 1

Semifinal 2

Final

References

Men's 00100 metre backstroke
Olympics
Men's events at the 2016 Summer Olympics